Zalamea la Real is a town and municipality located in the province of Huelva, Spain. According to the 2005 census, it had a population of 3,547 inhabitants and covers a  area (14.8 people/km2).

References

Municipalities in the Province of Huelva